Edward J. Boomer was a member of the Wisconsin State Assembly.

Biography
Boomer was born on March 20, 1821 in Warsaw, New York. He later moved to Trenton, Dodge County, Wisconsin.

Career
Boomer was a member of the Assembly during the 1874 Session. He was a Republican.

References

People from Warsaw, New York
People from Trenton, Dodge County, Wisconsin
Republican Party members of the Wisconsin State Assembly
1821 births
Year of death missing